Albizu is a Basque surname. Notable people with the surname include:

 Carlos Albizu Miranda (1920–1984), the cousin of the Puerto Rican Nationalist leader Pedro Albizu Campos
 Héctor Valdez Albizu (born 1947), the current Governor of the Banco Central de la República Dominicana
 Joseba Albizu (born 1978), a Spanish professional road bicycle racer
 Olga Albizu (1924–2005), an abstract expressionist painter
 Pedro Albizu Campos (1891–1965), a Puerto Rican politician